Ladder diagram may refer to:
 Message sequence chart, in Unified Modeling Language (UML)
 Ladder logic, a method of drawing electrical logic schematics. A ladder diagram represents a program in ladder logic.
 A method of juggling notation